Gorla refers to a district of Milan, Italy. 

Gorla may also refer to:

 Gorla (Milan Metro), metro station in Milan
 Gorla (surname)

See also